The Ross Township Municipal Building shooting occurred just after 7:00 p.m. on August 5, 2013, in Saylorsburg, Pennsylvania, United States, a small town in Monroe County. A gunman went on a shooting rampage at a public meeting of township supervisors in the municipal building, leaving three people dead and three others injured. The gunman, identified as Rockne Warren Newell, was described as having long feuded with township officials.

While approaching the building on foot, Newell fired a .223 Ruger Mini-14 rifle into the building 28 times, through windows. Then, he went back to his car to retrieve a 6-shot .44 Magnum Revolver before entering the building and the meeting room. There, he began shooting the handgun at meeting attendees. While the gunman was still shooting, two men struggled with him over the gun. They subdued, disarmed, and held him, preventing further deaths and injuries.

Linda Kozic, Frank Pirano, and Howard Beers were injured; while David Fleetwood, Gerard Kozic, and James "Vinny" LaGuardia were fatally wounded. During the struggle over the gun with Bernard Kozen and Mark Krashe, the gunman was wounded in the leg with his own weapon.

Legal proceedings
Attorneys William Ruzzo and Michael E. Weinstein were assigned to Newell's defense in August 2013, and remained his attorneys for the duration of the trial. Newell pleaded guilty to three counts of first degree murder and attempted murder charges on May 29, 2015, and was sentenced to three life terms as well as an additional 61 to 122 years for the attempted murder charges and is currently imprisoned in the State Correctional Institution – Rockview

See also
Kirkwood City Council shooting, a similar earlier case
Carl Drega, a similar earlier case
Moscone–Milk assassinations, a similar earlier case
James E. Davis (councilman), a New York City councilman, who was assassinated in city hall

References

2013 active shooter incidents in the United States
2013 in Pennsylvania
2013 murders in the United States
Assassinations in the United States
Crimes in Pennsylvania
Deaths by firearm in Pennsylvania
History of Monroe County, Pennsylvania
2013 mass shootings in the United States
Mass shootings in the United States
Murder in Pennsylvania
Political violence in the United States
Attacks in the United States in 2013
Mass shootings in Pennsylvania